A list of the films produced in Mexico in 1965 (see 1965 in film):

1965

External links

1965
Films
Mexican